Gozmanyia is a genus of snout moths. It was described by Roesler in 1965, and contains the species G. crassa. It is found in the Palestinian Territories.

References

Phycitinae
Monotypic moth genera
Moths of Asia